Lee Kyung-ryul (Hangul: 이경렬; born 16 January 1988) is a South Korean footballer who plays as a defender for Seoul E-Land.

Club career statistics

External links
 
 

1988 births
Living people
South Korean footballers
Association football defenders
Gyeongnam FC players
Busan IPark players
Gimcheon Sangmu FC players
Jeonnam Dragons players
Seoul E-Land FC players
K League 1 players
K League 2 players
Korea University alumni
People from Gyeongju
Sportspeople from North Gyeongsang Province